BDSM is a variety of erotic practices involving dominance and submission, roleplaying, restraint, and other interpersonal dynamics. Given the wide range of practices, some of which may be engaged in by people who do not consider themselves as practicing BDSM, inclusion in the BDSM community or subculture is usually dependent on self-identification and shared experience. Interest in BDSM can range from one-time experimentation to a lifestyle.

The following outline is provided as an overview of and topical guide to BDSM:

Bondage 

By material
 Japanese bondage
 Metal bondage
 Handcuffs
 Rope bondage

By body part
 Self-bondage
 Head bondage
 Neck
 Collar (BDSM)
 Stocks
 Arms
 Wrists - Bondage cuffs
 Arms - Armbinder
 Stocks
 Elbow bondage
 Breast bondage
 Crotch rope

Discipline 
Discipline (BDSM)

Dominance and Submission (D&s or D/s) 

Dominance and submission
 Ageplay
 Fear play
 Ass worship
 Body worship
 Boot worship
 Erotic humiliation
 Verbal humiliation
 Erotic hypnosis
 Erotic sexual denial
 Facesitting
 Female dominance
 Female submission
 Male dominance
 Male submission
 Bladder desperation
 Feminization
 Master/slave
 Medical scene
 Rape scene
 Servitude
 Sexual slavery

Sadomasochism 
Sadomasochism

Types of play 

 Age play
 Animal roleplay
 Breath play
 Fear play
 Knife play
 Needle play
 Pain play
 Sensation play
 Temperature play
 Fire play
 Ice play
 Wax play

Types of torture 

 Enema play
 Erotic spanking
 Speculum play
 Breast torture
 Nipple clamp
 Nipple piercing
 Cock and ball torture
 Pussy torture
 Tickle torture

BDSM equipment 

List of bondage equipment
 Gag (BDSM)
 Ball gag –
 Bit gag –
 Funnel gag –
 Jennings gag –
 Muzzle gag –
 OTM gag –
 Pecker gag –
 Penis gag –
 Stuff gag –
 Tape gag –
 Whitehead gag –
 Bondage harness
 Cock harness
 Dildo harness
 Head harness

Sexual fetishism and Paraphilia 
Paraphilia –
Sexual sadism disorder
Sexual fetishism –
 Breast fetishism
 Diaper fetishism
 Foot fetishism
 Fur fetishism
 Leather fetishism
 Latex and PVC fetishism
 Spandex fetishism
 Stocking fetishism

BDSM terminology 

Bondage –
Discipline (BDSM) –
Dominance & submission –
Sadomasochism –

 Roles
 Bottom –
 Top –
 Dominant –
 Submissive –
 Master/slave –
 Dominatrix
 Serving top
 Sexual slavery (BDSM) –
 Sexual fetishism –
 Hard limit (BDSM) –
 Limits (BDSM) –
 Negotiation (BDSM) –
 Contract (BDSM) –
 Play (BDSM) –
 Scene (BDSM) –
 Session (BDSM) –

Significant BDSM people 

 Peter Acworth
 Jeff Gord
 Laura Antoniou
 Maria Beatty
 Barbara Behr
 Theresa Berkley
 Gloria Brame
 Böse Buben
 Richard Francis Burton
 Patrick Califia
 Vanessa Duriès
 Dossie Easton
 Bob Flanagan
 Maîtresse Françoise
 Matthias T. J. Grimme 
 Janet Hardy
 Alfred Kinsey
 Irving Klaw
 Richard Freiherr von Krafft-Ebing
 John Norman
 Bettie Page
 Pauline Réage
 Catherine Robbe-Grillet
 Gayle Rubin
 Leopold von Sacher-Masoch
 Marquis de Sade
 Dita von Teese
 Jay Wiseman

Media 

 A Defence of Masochism
 Belle de jour (novel)
 Belle de jour (film)
 Billions (TV series)
 The Bitter Tears of Petra von Kant
 Bonding (TV series)
 The Claiming of Sleeping Beauty
 De Usu Flagrorum
 Diagnostic and Statistical Manual of Mental Disorders
 The Ethical Slut
 Fetishes (film)
 Fifty Shades of Grey
 The Image (film)
 The Image (novel)
 Imaginative Sex
 Mano Destra
 Maîtresse
 Moonlight Whispers
 The Piano Teacher (Jelinek novel)
 Preaching to the Perverted (film)
 Psychopathia Sexualis
 Romance (1999 film)
 Secretary (2002 film)
 Seduction: The Cruel Woman
 Shrimp (film)
 Skin Two
 Spanking Love
 Story of O
 Submission (TV series)
 The Ties That Bind (novel)
 Tokyo Decadence
 Venus in Furs
 A Woman in Flames

Lists 
 Glossary of BDSM
 BDSM artists
 BDSM authors
 BDSM equipment
 BDSM in culture and media
 BDSM literature
 BDSM organizations
 BDSM photographers
 List of bondage positions
 List of universities with BDSM clubs
 :Category:BDSM

See also 
 Outline of human sexuality
 Sex position

References

External links 

  BDSM Glossary

 List
BDSM
BDSM topics
BDSM topics